Elizabeth Letson Bryan (April 9, 1874February 28, 1919) was one of the first American women to be a director of a museum. She was a noted American malacologist.

Early life 
Elizabeth "Jennie" Letson was born April 9, 1874, at Griffins Mills, New York (Erie County). The only child of Augustus Franklin Letson (1841-1900) and Nellie Webb Letson (1850-1924). Her mother was an 8th descendant of original settler William Bradford from the Mayflower and was direct descendant of Governor Bradford, first governor of Massachusetts.

Education 
She attended schools in Buffalo, New York. At an early age, she became interested in natural history, in particular conchology. After graduating, she continued her education at the Academy of Natural Sciences of Philadelphia (ANSP) after receiving the Jessup fellowship. She spent two years working with Henry Augustus Pilsbry. Later, she studied at the United States National Museum in Washington, D.C. In 1906, Alfred University conferred upon her the honorary degree of Doctor of Science.

Career 
At the age 18, she started working at the Buffalo Society of Natural Sciences in 1892 where she would remain for 17 years. At first she volunteered to clean the museum and arrange the library. She eventually rose to the position on Director of the Museum of the Buffalo Society of Natural Sciences in 1899. Elizabeth married William Alanson Bryan on March 16, 1909, at St. Paul's Episcopal Church in Buffalo, New York. They moved to Hawaii in May 1909 where her husband was a professor at the College of Hawaii. She worked as the librarian at the college. While living in Hawaii, she continued to collect marine shells and helping her husband with his research publications. Dr. Letson was a member of the American Anthropological Society, the National Geographic Society, the American Association for the Advancement of Science, the Audubon Society of Pennsylvania, the New York State committee for the Women's Out-of-door Art League, the American Civic Association, the Conchological Society of Great Britain and Ireland, the Buffalo Society, and the Mayflower Society of New York State.

Death 
She died at 11:20 PM on February 28, 1919, in Honolulu, Hawaii of heart disease. She was buried at the family plot in Oakwood Cemetery East Aurora, Erie County, New York, USA. Her mentor, Henry A. Pilsbry wrote her obituary in The Nautilus (journal of malacology).

Species named in honor of Elizabeth Letson 
Amnicola letsoni (Walker, 1901) 
Tellina (Arcopagia) elizabethae (Pilsbry, 1917) type number 80253 stored at Academy of Natural Sciences in Philadelphia
Turbonilla (Evaletta) elizabethae (Pilsbry, 1917) type number 117596 at Academy of Natural Sciences in Philadelphia

Publications 
Sinstral ampullaria (1897)
Description of a New Tethys (Aplysia) (1898)
Post-pliocene fossils of the Niagara river gravels (1901)
Check List of the Mollusca of New York (1905)
A Partial List of the Shells Found in Erie and Niagara Counties and Niagara Frontier (1909)

Species named by Elizabeth Letson 
Tethys pilsbryi  (Letson, 1898)

References

1874 births
1919 deaths
People from Erie County, New York
19th-century American scientists
20th-century American scientists
American malacologists